The environment of Trinidad and Tobago reflects the interaction between its biotic diversity, high population density, and industrialised economy.

Environment of Trinidad and Tobago

Biota/Fauna

The flora of Trinidad and Tobago is believed to include about 2,500 species of vascular plants.  There are about 50 species of freshwater fish (plus 30 marine species which are occasionally found in freshwater) 400–500 marine fish species, 30 amphibian species, about 90 reptiles, 469 species of birds, and 98 mammal species.

Geography

Land

Water

Climate change

Energy

Pollution control

Protected areas

Waste management

Environmental policy and law

Treaties and international agreements
Trinidad and Tobago is a signatory to a number of treaties and international agreements:

party to:
Biodiversity, Climate Change, Climate Change-Kyoto Protocol, Endangered Species, Hazardous Wastes, Law of the Sea, Nuclear Test Ban, Ozone Layer Protection, Tropical Timber 83, Tropical Timber 94, Wetlands

signed, but not ratified:
none of the selected agreements

Environmental organisations

Environmental issues
Environmental issues are water pollution from agricultural chemicals, industrial wastes, and raw sewage; oil pollution of beaches; deforestation; soil erosion.

Trinidad and Tobago had a 2018 Forest Landscape Integrity Index mean score of 6.62/10, ranking it 69th globally out of 172 countries.

See also

List of environmental issues

References

External links
Environmental Management Authority